All Things New is the third studio album from Rivers & Robots. They released the album on 8 July 2014.

Critical reception

Awarding the album four stars at Worship Leader, Jeremy Armstrong states, "Rivers & Robots is spare folky guitar and ambient/electronic rock that harmonizes as good as any sweet-heart band you'll hear pouring out of college dorm rooms these days." Lins Honeyman, rating the album a ten out of ten for Cross Rhythms, writes, "Ogden's quietly inventive songwriting and wistful vocal delivery coming as standard as well as his ability to offer up an innately worshipful piece of work that refreshingly doesn't sound at all like worship music." Giving the album three stars from New Release Today, Jonathan J. Francesco, says, "Rivers & Robots know who they have set out to become, and this album does a solid job of defining them." Philip Aldis, indicating in a four and a half star review by Louder Than the Music, describes, "It’s lush. It’s beautiful. It’s original."

Track listing

References

2015 albums
Fervent Records albums
Word Records albums